Steven Clark "Steve" McDowall (born 27 August 1961) is a former rugby union player from New Zealand (often erroneously written Steve McDowell); he played as a Prop forward and he won 46 full caps for the All Blacks between 1985 and 1992.

He was also a member of the victorious New Zealand squad at the 1987 Rugby World Cup.

He has been assistant coach of Romania national rugby union team since 2010.

References

External links

Daily Telegraph Profile
All Blacks Profile

1961 births
Living people
New Zealand international rugby union players
New Zealand rugby union players
People educated at Western Heights High School
Old Belvedere R.F.C. players
Expatriate rugby union players in Ireland
New Zealand expatriate sportspeople in Ireland
Sportspeople from Rotorua
Rugby union players from Rotorua
Rugby union props